The England women's cricket team toured Australia and New Zealand in January and February 1992. England played three Test matches against New Zealand, one Test match against Australia, and against both sides in a ODI tri-series. The Test match against Australia was played for the Women's Ashes, which Australia won, therefore retaining the Ashes. Australia also won the tri-series, on virtue of winning the group stage after the Final against England ended in a no result, whilst England beat New Zealand in their test series 1–0.

Tour of New Zealand

Squads

Tour matches

60-over match: Northern Selection v England

60-over match: Northern Selection v England

3-day match: New Zealand President's XI v England

3-day match: New Zealand Under-23s v England

Test Series

1st Test

2nd Test

3rd Test

Tri-Series

Squads

Group stage

Final

Tour of Australia

Squads

Test Match

See also
 1991–92 Shell Tri-Series

References

External links
England Women tour of New Zealand 1991/92 from Cricinfo
England Women tour of Australia 1991/92 from Cricinfo

The Women's Ashes
England women's cricket team tours
Women's international cricket tours of Australia
Women's international cricket tours of New Zealand